Wila Salla (Aymara wila salla rocks, cliffs, "red rocks", Hispanicized spelling Velasalla) is a  mountain in the Andes of southern Peru. It is located in the Puno Region, Puno Province, on the border of the districts Pichacani and San Antonio. Wila Salla lies northeast of the mountain Chuqipata.

References

Mountains of Puno Region
Mountains of Peru